Eye of Fashion is a 1976 bronze sculpture by Robert Cronbach, installed outside the Fashion Institute of Technology's Goodman Center, in Manhattan, New York City.

See also

 1976 in art

References

1976 sculptures
Bronze sculptures in Manhattan
Fashion Institute of Technology
Outdoor sculptures in Manhattan